Hassan Saleh (born 22 October 1979) is an Australian former professional rugby league footballer who played in the 1990s and 2000s. He played for the Wests Tigers, St George Illawarra Dragons and the Cronulla-Sutherland Sharks in the National Rugby League competition. He also represented the Lebanon national rugby league team on several occasions, including the 2000 World Cup.

Background
Saleh was born in Sydney, New South Wales, Australia, he is of Lebanese descent.

Playing career
Saleh made his first grade debut for the Wests Tigers in round 7 of the 2001 NRL season against the Canberra Raiders at Campbelltown Stadium.  In 2003, Saleh signed with St George and made 11 appearances for the club before signing with rivals Cronulla-Sutherland for the 2004 season.  

Saleh's final game in the top grade was for Cronulla in round 4 2004 against South Sydney at the Sydney Football Stadium.  Saleh scored a try during the game which Cronulla lost 36–12.

References

External links
NRL Scoring Summary

1979 births
Living people
Australian people of Lebanese descent
Australian rugby league players
Cronulla-Sutherland Sharks players
Lebanon national rugby league team captains
Lebanon national rugby league team players
Rugby league fullbacks
Rugby league players from Sydney
Rugby league wingers
St. George Illawarra Dragons players
Wests Tigers players